The BRM P139 was a Formula One racing car designed by Alec Osborn, based on the original P126/133/138 design by Len Terry, which raced during the  and  seasons. It was powered by a 3.0-litre V12 engine. The car was uncompetitive, which resulted in team boss Tony Rudd being asked to resign, with his position being taken over by Tony Southgate, Tim Parnell and Aubrey Woods. After the team did not attend the French Grand Prix, a redesigned P139 appeared at the British Grand Prix, with a roomier, more bulbous cockpit and additional strengthening, giving the P139 a cylindrical appearance. The revised car was barely an improvement on the original P139, and was replaced by the P153 for the 1970 season. The P139 made one final appearance, at the 1970 South African Grand Prix, driven by George Eaton, who was effectively paying for his drive, and thus did not receive a 'works' P153.

Formula One World Championship results
(key)

 Two points scored by the BRM P138.   All points scored by the BRM P153.

References

BRM Formula One cars
1969 Formula One season cars
1970 Formula One season cars